Lady Wolhwawon was the daughter of Yeong-Jang who became the 24th wife of Taejo of Goryeo. There were no much records left about her existences or personal details.

References

External links
월화원부인 on Encykorea .

Year of birth unknown
Year of death unknown
Consorts of Taejo of Goryeo